Jānis Kalniņš (born 13 December 1991) is a Latvian professional ice hockey goaltender for Amur Khabarovsk of the KHL.

Playing career
He formerly played with Dinamo Riga in the KHL before signing as a free agent to a multi-year contract with Jokerit on June 15, 2018.

Kalniņš enjoyed three successful seasons with Jokerit leaving following the 2020–21 season to sign a one-year contract with reigning Swedish champions, Växjö Lakers of the SHL, on 28 June 2021.

Kalniņš also represented Latvian national team at several tournaments, including the 2022 Winter Olympics, but was banned from all national team activities after moving to Russia following the 2022 Russian invasion of Ukraine.

References

External links

1991 births
Amur Khabarovsk players
Fehérvár AV19 players
Dinamo Riga players
Dunaújvárosi Acélbikák players
Jokerit players
Living people
Latvian ice hockey goaltenders
HK Liepājas Metalurgs players
People from Limbaži
Ice hockey players at the 2022 Winter Olympics
Olympic ice hockey players of Latvia
Tappara players
Växjö Lakers players